Generalized blockmodeling of binary networks (also relational blockmodeling) is an approach of generalized blockmodeling, analysing the binary network(s). 

As most network analyses deal with binary networks, this approach is also considered as the fundamental approach of blockmodeling. This is especially noted, as the set of ideal blocks, when used for interpretation of blockmodels, have binary link patterns, which precludes them to be compared with valued empirical blocks. 

When analysing the binary networks, the criterion function is measuring block inconsistencies, while also reporting the possible errors.

It is also used as a basis for developing the generalized blockmodeling of valued networks.

References

See also
 homogeneity blockmodeling
 binary relation
 binary matrix

Blockmodeling